Nedžad Botonjič (25 August 1979 – 7 February 2005) was a Slovenian football goalkeeper. He played for NK Factor Ljubljana when suffering a heart attack during a training session in 2005.

References

1979 births
2005 deaths
Slovenian footballers
Association football goalkeepers
ND Gorica players
NK Dravograd players
NK Mura players
NK IB 1975 Ljubljana players
Slovenian PrvaLiga players
Association football players who died while playing
Accidental deaths in Slovenia